Wendy Mercedes Umanzor Sagastume (born 14 September 1984) is a Honduran footballer who plays as a midfielder. She has been a member of the Honduras women's national team.

International career
Umanzor capped for Honduras at senior level during the 2014 CONCACAF Women's Championship qualification.

International goals
Scores and results list Honduras' goal tally first

References

1984 births
Living people
People from Yoro Department
Honduran women's footballers
Women's association football midfielders
Honduras women's international footballers
LGBT association football players
Honduran LGBT people